Glen David Brin (born October 6, 1950) is an American scientist and author of science fiction. He has won the Hugo, Locus, Campbell and Nebula Awards. His novel The Postman was adapted into a 1997 feature film starring Kevin Costner.

Early life and education

Brin was born in Glendale, California, in 1950 to Selma and Herb Brin. He graduated from the California Institute of Technology with a Bachelor of Science in astronomy, in 1973. At the University of California, San Diego, he earned a Master of Science in electrical engineering (optics) in 1978 and a Doctor of Philosophy degree in astronomy in 1981.

Career
From 1983 to 1986, he was a postdoctoral research fellow at the California Space Institute, of the University of California, at the San Diego campus in La Jolla.
In 2010, Brin became a fellow of the Institute for Ethics and Emerging Technologies. He helped establish the Arthur C. Clarke Center for Human Imagination at UCSD. He serves on the advisory board of NASA's Innovative and Advanced Concepts group and frequently does futurist consulting for corporations and government agencies. 

Brin has a side career in public speaking and consultation. He appears frequently on science- or future-related television shows such as The Universe, Life After People, Alien Encounters, Worlds of Tomorrow. He consults and speaks for a wide variety of groups interested in the future, ranging from Defense Department agencies and the CIA to Procter & Gamble, SAP, Google, and other major corporations. He has participated in discussions at the Philanthropy Roundtable and other groups seeking innovative problem solving approaches. 

As of 2013, he served on the Board of Advisors for the Museum of Science Fiction.

Personal life
Brin has Polish Jewish ancestry, from the area around Konin. His grandfather was drafted into the Russian army and fought in the Russian-Japanese War of 1905. 

As of 2022, Brin was living in San Diego County, California, with his wife and children.

Works 
Most of Brin's fiction is categorized as hard science fiction, in that they apply some degree of plausible scientific or technological change as important plot elements. About half of Brin's works are in his Uplift Universe. These have twice won the Hugo Award for Best Novel.

Much of Brin's work outside the Uplift series focuses on technology's effects on human society, a common theme of contemporary North American science fiction. This is most noticeable in The Practice Effect, Glory Season, and Kiln People.

Influence of Jewish heritage 

Brin's Jewish heritage is the source of two other strong themes in his works. Tikkun Olam ("repairing the world", i.e. people have a duty to make the world a better place) is originally a religious concept, but Brin, like many non-orthodox Jews, has adapted this into a secular notion of working to improve the human condition, to increase knowledge, and to prevent long-term evils. Brin has confirmed that this notion in part underscores the notion of humans as "caretakers" of sentient-species-yet-to-be, as he explains in a concluding note at the end of Startide Rising; and it plays a key role in The Uplift War, in which the Thennanin are converted from enemies to allies of the Terragens (humans and other sapients that originated on Earth) when they realize that making the world a better place and being good care-takers are core values of both civilizations. Many of Brin's novels emphasize another element of Jewish tradition: the importance of laws and legality, whether intergalactic law in the Uplift series or that of near-future California in Kiln People. Still, Brin has stated, "Truly mature citizens ought not to need an intricate wrapping of laws and regulations, in order to do what common sense dictates as good for all".

Bibliography

Fiction

The Uplift stories 
The Uplift novels are:
Sundiver (1980), 
Startide Rising (1983), . Hugo and Locus SF Awards winner, 1984; Nebula Award winner, 1983
The Uplift War (1987), . Hugo and Locus SF Awards winner, 1988; Nebula Award nominee, 1987
The Uplift Trilogy (sometimes called the Uplift Storm trilogy):
Brightness Reef (1995) . Hugo and Locus SF Awards nominee, 1996
Infinity's Shore (1996), 
Heaven's Reach (1998), 

Short stories:
 "Aficionado" (1998) was first published as "Life in the Extreme" in Popular Science magazine, republished in the 2003 limited-edition collection Tomorrow Happens, and included in Brin's 2012 novel Existence. It is available on Brin's website. "Aficionado" takes place before the novels.
 "Temptation" (1999) appeared in Robert Silverberg's anthology Far Horizons: All New Tales from the Greatest Worlds of Science Fiction and is set after the events of Infinity's Shore.

Contacting Aliens: An Illustrated Guide to David Brin's Uplift Universe (2002),  is co-written by Brin and Kevin Lenagh

High Horizon
 Colony High (February 2021) 
 Castaways of New Mojave (August 2021)  – with Jeff Carlson

Other fiction
Stand-alone novels:
The Practice Effect (1984), 
The Postman (1985),  – Campbell and Locus SF Awards winner, Hugo Award nominee, 1986; Nebula Award nominee, 1985 Originally appeared, in substantially different form, as a three-part novella in Isaac Asimov's Science Fiction Magazine. Filmed by Kevin Costner as a major motion picture.
Heart of the Comet (1986),  (with Gregory Benford) – Locus SF Award nominee, 1987
Earth (1990),  – Hugo and Locus SF Awards nominee, 1991. Contains many successful predictions of current trends (such as email spam) and technologies.
Glory Season (1993),  – Hugo and Locus SF Awards nominee, 1994
Kiln People (2002),  – Campbell, Clarke, Hugo, and Locus SF Awards nominee, 2003. Kiln People (published in the UK as Kil'n People) was shortlisted in four different awards for best SF/fantasy novel of 2002—the Hugo, the Locus, the John W. Campbell Award, and the Arthur C. Clarke Award; each time finishing behind a different book.
Existence, Tor Books, (2012), 
The Ancient Ones, self-published, (2020), 

Graphic novels:
Forgiveness (2002),  – set in the Star Trek: The Next Generation universe
The Life Eaters (2003),  – published by the Wildstorm imprint of DC Comics, art by Scott Hampton
 Tinkerers (2010) – discussion of the causes of the decline of American manufacturing

His short fiction has been collected in:
The River of Time (1986), 
Otherness (1994), 
Tomorrow Happens (2003) 
Insistence of Vision (2016), 

Other works by Brin include his addition to Asimov's Foundation Universe:
Foundation's Triumph (1999), 

and his addition to Eric Flint's 1632-verse:
"71" in Ring of Fire IV (2016), 

Brin designed the game Tribes, published in 1998 by Steve Jackson Games, and wrote the storyline for the 2000 Dreamcast video game Ecco the Dolphin: Defender of the Future.

Nonfiction
Ongoing:
 Articles in professional journals, including The Astrophysical Journal and Information Technology and Libraries; as well as popular magazines, such as Omni, Nature, and Popular Science.

Books:
 Extraterrestrial Civilization by Thomas Kuiper and Glen David Brin, (1989) 
 The Transparent Society: Will Technology Force Us to Choose Between Privacy and Freedom? (1998) —won the Eli M. Oboler Award for intellectual freedom from the American Library Association
 Star Wars on Trial: Science Fiction and Fantasy Writers Debate the Most Popular Science Fiction Films of All Time (2006) 
 Polemical Judo: Memes for our Political Knife-fight (2019)

Honors and awards
 1984 Nebula Award for Best Novel
 1984, 1988 Hugo Award for Best Novel
 1985 Inkpot Award
 1984, 1986, 1988 Locus Award for Best Science Fiction Novel 
 1985 Hugo Award for Best Short Story 
 Minor planet 5748 Davebrin, discovered by Eleanor Helin in 1991, is named in his honor.

References

External links

 
 David Brin's blog, Contrary Brin
 
 
 
 

Interviews
 Critical Resources :: David Brin
 Interview with David Brin at SFFWorld.com(2002-07-19)
 Interview with David Brin at Actusf.com
 All of David Brin's audio interviews on the podcast The Future And You, in which he describes his expectations of the future
 Metareview, Kiln/Kil'n People
 Video of conversation between David Brin and James Pinkerton on Bloggingheads.tv
 
 Alliance for Progress Encyclopedia, encyclopedia of David Brin's Uplift Universe

 
1950 births
20th-century American male writers
20th-century American novelists
21st-century American male writers
21st-century American novelists
American futurologists
American graphic novelists
American male novelists
American male short story writers
American science fiction writers
American short story writers
American transhumanists
Analog Science Fiction and Fact people
California Institute of Technology alumni
Hugo Award-winning writers
Jewish American writers
Jewish novelists
Living people
Nebula Award winners
University of California, San Diego alumni
Writers from Glendale, California
Inkpot Award winners